Yellow House may refer to:
The Yellow House, an 1888 painting by Vincent van Gogh
The Yellow House (book), a 2019 memoir by Sarah M. Broom
Yellow House (album), an album by Grizzly Bear
Yellow House, Pennsylvania, a town in the Delaware Valley of Pennsylvania
Yellow House Artist Collective, a collective in Sydney, Australia
Yellow House Canyon, a canyon in west Texas
Yellow House Draw, a dry watercourse that extends across the Llano Estacado of west Texas
Yellow house in Albania, a location involved alleged organ theft of ethnic Serbs during the Kosovo War
Beit Beirut or the Yellow House, a museum and urban cultural center celebrating the history of Beirut
 The Yellow House (2007 film), a film by Amor Hakkar and winner of the Prize of the Ecumenical Jury at Locarno
Yellow House (Venezuela), an historic building in Caracas and location of the Venezuelan Foreign Ministry